T. D. "Ted" Little (born June 21, 1942) is a former member of the Alabama Senate, representing the 21st District from 1974 to 1986 and the 27th District from 1990 to 2010. He served a total of 32 years in the Alabama Senate. He ran for the U. S. Congress in Alabama's 3rd Congressional District in 1996, being the Democratic nominee, but lost to Bob Riley (R) in the general election. Little later lost his seat in the state senate after he was defeated by Republican-challenger Tom Whatley in the general election on November 2, 2010.

External links
Alabama State Legislature - Senator T. D. Little official government website
Project Vote Smart - Senator T. D. Little (AL) profile
Follow the Money - T. D. Little
2006 2002 1998 campaign contributions

Alabama state senators
1942 births
Living people
People from Andalusia, Alabama